Milanovići may refer to:

 Milanovići (Bugojno), a village in Bosnia and Herzegovina
 Milanovići (Goražde), a village in Bosnia and Herzegovina